Jeff Schexnaider is a former American baseball coach. Schexnaider was the head baseball coach at the University of Louisiana at Monroe from 2006 to 2014, compiling an overall record of 212–254.

Head coaching record

References

External links
 ULMWarhawks.com bio

Living people
Gulf Coast State Commodores baseball players
High school baseball coaches in the United States
Louisiana–Monroe Warhawks baseball coaches
Louisiana–Monroe Warhawks baseball players
Year of birth missing (living people)
Place of birth missing (living people)